The Petrucci Family was a royal Italian family during the Renaissance.

History
The Petrucci family ruled the Italian city-state of Siena from 1487 to 1525. Pandolfo Petrucci was the first ruler and brought prosperity to Siena. Returning from exile, he seized many political offices until he became the first absolute ruler of Siena. Pandolfo had 3 sons, Borghese Petrucci, Alfonso Petrucci and Fabio Petrucci. After Pandolfo died in 1512, Borghese succeeded him, only to be ousted by his cousin, cardinal Raffaello, with the help of Pope Leo X. In the wake of more responsibilities from the Church, Raffaello ceded control of the city to his cousin, Francesco Petrucci. Francesco was exiled after a successful coup by Pandolfo's youngest son, Fabio Petrucci. Fabio was forced into exile by the Sienese people in 1525, marking the end of the Petrucci dynasty.

Rulers

Family tree
 Bold names= rulers of Siena

References

 
Italian noble families